Stanichnoye is a rural locality (a selo) in Alexeyevsky District, Belgorod Oblast, Russia. The population was 217 as of 2010. There are 4 streets.

Geography 
Stanichnoye is located 25 km southwest of Alexeyevka (the district's administrative centre) by road. Kamyshevatoye is the nearest rural locality.

References 

Rural localities in Alexeyevsky District, Belgorod Oblast
Biryuchensky Uyezd